Blastobasis nothrotes is a moth in the  family Blastobasidae. It is found in the United States, including Arizona and California.

The wingspan is about 12 mm. The forewings are dirty white, sprinkled with grayish fuscous. The hindwings are brownish gray.

References

Moths described in 1907
Blastobasis